The 1949 Swiss motorcycle Grand Prix was the second race of the 1949 Motorcycle Grand Prix season. It took place on the weekend of 3 July 1949 at the Bremgarten circuit.

British rider Leslie Graham won the 500 cc race riding an AJS from Arciso Artesiani and Harold Daniell.

500 cc classification

350 cc classification

250 cc classification

125 cc classification

Sidecar classification

References

Swiss motorcycle Grand Prix
Swiss motorcycle Grand Prix
Motorcycle Grand Prix